Miocorvus larteti is an extinct genus and species of corvid bird from the Miocene of Europe.

References

Corvidae
Fossil taxa described in 1871
Birds described in 1871